This article contains a list of Michelin starred restaurants in Chicago since 2011. Chicago was the fifth US city to be chosen to have a dedicated Michelin Guide in 2011, after New York City, San Francisco, Los Angeles, and Las Vegas, although the Las Vegas guide was later discontinued. Although earlier editions included restaurants from the suburbs, since 2013, all the restaurants have been located within the city proper.

Alphabetic list

References

Lists of restaurants
Chicago-related lists
Chicago